Kenneth Dunstan Golding (18 August 1921 – 24 April 1985) was a Singaporean sailor. He competed in the Dragon event at the 1956 Summer Olympics.

References

External links
 

1921 births
1985 deaths
Singaporean male sailors (sport)
Olympic sailors of Singapore
Sailors at the 1956 Summer Olympics – Dragon
People from Rochford
20th-century Singaporean people